Kněžice is a municipality and village in Jihlava District in the Vysočina Region of the Czech Republic. It has about 1,400 inhabitants.

Administrative parts
Villages of Brodce, Rychlov and Víska are administrative parts of Kněžice.

Notable people
Jaroslav Kožešník (1907–1985), scientist and politician

References

Villages in Jihlava District